Alexander Govan (16 June 1929 – 10 June 2016) was a Scottish professional footballer who played at outside left. Most of his career was spent with Plymouth Argyle (in two spells) and with Birmingham City during their most successful period in the 1950s, and he also had a short spell with Portsmouth. He is credited with being responsible for Birmingham's fans adopting Harry Lauder's song "Keep right on to the end of the road" as their anthem.

Life and career
Govan was born in Glasgow. He played football for Bridgeton Boys Club, was capped for Scotland at schoolboy level, and played one youth international match for his country, against Wales youth team in 1945. He was recommended to Plymouth Argyle manager Jack Tresadern by Alec Hardie, head of the club's Scottish scouting network, who thought he would go on to represent Scotland at senior level. After a successful trial, he was eventually persuaded to make the long trip south, and he signed for Argyle at the end of August 1946. Govan admits there was an incentive apart from the football: 

He scored 30 goals in 117 appearances for Plymouth, and was part of the team that won the Third Division South championship in the 1951–52 season.

When Birmingham City showed an interest in signing Govan, he was reluctant to move away from the Plymouth area, as his wife was a local girl, but when manager Bob Brocklebank promised them a house, the deal went ahead.
Govan signed for Birmingham in June 1953 for a fee of £6,500. He scored on his debut and finished that season with eight goals. With the addition of the prolific Eddy Brown to regular top scorer Peter Murphy, a former league-winner with Tottenham Hotspur, combined with the creativity of Govan, fellow Plymouth winger Gordon Astall and Welsh international Noel Kinsey who had all joined the club the previous year, the Birmingham forward line outclassed any other in the Second Division. All five reached double figures as the club won the 1954–55 championship.

Though unable to score at such a rate in the top flight, the club still achieved its highest ever league finish of sixth place. They also reached the 1956 FA Cup Final, and it was during that season's FA Cup campaign that Govan was responsible for Harry Lauder's song "Keep right on to the end of the road" being adopted (and adapted) as the anthem of the Birmingham City fans. There is no definitive explanation of how this happened. One version has him heard singing it on the coach on the way to the quarter-final against Arsenal;

another has him revealing in a radio interview that it was his favourite song.
 Either way, by the time the football correspondent of the Times came to write his Cup Final preview, the song was well enough established for him to describe how

The strengths of Govan's game were hard work, pace on the wing and exceptional goalscoring ability. In April 1956, his ability was recognised by the national selectors when he received his only call-up to the full Scotland squad for a match against Austria. Unfortunately for him the international match was due to be played only three days before the Cup Final, so Birmingham refused to release him. The following season, he was Birmingham's leading scorer with 30 goals in all competitions. This was a remarkable tally, especially for a winger, and included no fewer than five hat-tricks:

He also took a productive part in Birmingham's first foray into European competition in the 1955–58 Inter-Cities Fairs Cup, scoring both goals to beat Inter Milan 2–1 and thereby top the qualifying group.

By 1958 his pace was beginning to flag. Winger Harry Hooper came in from Wolverhampton Wanderers for a £20,000 fee. In March 1958 Govan was transferred to Portsmouth but failed to settle; six months later he returned to his first club Plymouth Argyle. He contributed to the club winning the Third Division championship that season before retiring the following year, and settling in Plymouth.

In 2012, Govan was one of seven former players elected to Birmingham City's Hall of Fame.

Govan died at his Plymouth home on 10 June 2016 at the age of 86.

Honours
Plymouth Argyle
 Third Division South champions 1952.
 Third Division champions 1959.

Birmingham City
Second Division champions 1955.
FA Cup finalist 1956.
 Club's top scorer 1956–57.

References

External links
 

1929 births
2016 deaths
Footballers from Glasgow
Scottish footballers
Association football wingers
Plymouth Argyle F.C. players
Birmingham City F.C. players
Portsmouth F.C. players
Truro City F.C. managers
English Football League players
Scotland youth international footballers
Scottish football managers
FA Cup Final players